TARMED is a system of procedure codes used in Switzerland.

References

Clinical procedure classification
Healthcare in Switzerland